Cuemba is a town and municipality in Bié Province in Angola. The municipality had a population of 56,963 in 2014.

See also 

 Railway stations in Angola

References 

Populated places in Bié Province
Municipalities of Angola